2014 CEMAC Cup was the ninth edition of the CEMAC Cup - the football championship of Central African nations.
The tournament was held in Equatorial Guinea from December 1–14.

Group A

Cameroon

Coach: François Heya

Central African Republic

Coach: Etienne Kopo Momokoamas

Goalkeepers

•	1) Samolah Elvis (EFC5)

•	2) Gondje Evrard (DFC8)

•	3) Gbavito Levant (Olympique)

Defenders

•	4) Mangou Acquis Florent (DFC8)

•	5) Tamboulas Parfait (Olympique)

•	6) Kéthévoama Thérence (SCAF)

•	7) Bedot Junior (SCAF)

•	8) Boutou Odin (DFC8)

•	9) Azou Brice (DFC8)

Midfielders

•       10) Dimokoyen Symphor (Fatima)

•	11) Bekaïn Steve (Comboni)

•	12) Gbafio Semboy Jeffersson (Tempête)

•	13) Bokanda Normand (Tempête)

•	14) Gueze Ulrich (Olympique)

•	15) Toropité Trésor (DFC8)

•	16) Gofité Doualan (Comboni)

•	17) Ngaïdangare Christian (FCFDS, 2e division)

•	18) Sanféï Wilson

Strikers

•	19) Bida David (DFC8)

•	20) Sandjo Boris (DFC8)

•	21) Grengou Cyrus (SCAF)

•       22)  Gael Guétoua (EFC5)

Equatorial Guinea
Coach: Aniceto Okenve

Goalkeepers

 13 Felipe Ovono

Defenders

 3 Bama
 5 Adriano Pereira dos Santos
 4 Diosdado Mbele
 Sebastián Bonifacio Nguema Esono

Midfielders

 6 Juvenal Edjogo-Owono (C)
 10 Dio
 18 Mike Campaz
 19 Viera Ellong

Strikers

 7 César Augusto Rivas
 11 Rubén Darío
 Eusebio Edjang
 Wenceslao Afugu Nkogo

Group B
Source:

Chad
Coach: Emmanuel Trégoat

Congo
Coach: Paolo Berrettini

Gabon

Coach: Stéphane Bouguedza

References

CEMAC Cup